Calonarius luteicolor is a species of fungus in the family Cortinariaceae.

Taxonomy 
It was described as new to science in 1944 by American mycologist Alexander H. Smith, who called it Cortinarius orichalceus var. olympianus f. luteifolius.

Molecular analysis of the internal transcribed spacer DNA regions  demonstrated that this taxon was sufficiently distinct genetically to warrant designation as a species, and it was renamed in 2014 and placed in subgenus Phlegmacium of the Cortinarius genus.

In 2022 the species was transferred from Cortinarius and reclassified as Calonarius luteicolor based on genomic data.

Etymology 
The specific epithet luteicolor refers to yellowish colors of the cap and gills.

Habitat and distribution 
The mushroom is found in the Pacific Northwest region of the United States, and British Columbia in Canada.

See also
List of Cortinarius species

References

External links

luteicolor
Fungi described in 1944
Fungi of Canada
Fungi of the United States
Fungi without expected TNC conservation status